Milestones is a 1981 video game published by Creative Computing for the Apple II.

Description
Milestones is a computer auto race card game similar to Touring. The players receive cards that contain events occurring during a car race. Some of these move the player forward towards the 1000 mile point, and the general goal is to play enough of these to cross the line first. Other cards are hazards that can be played against the opponent, or solutions to those hazards. For instance, a hazard might be a flat tire card, while the remedy is a spare tire card. Normally played by two or more players, in Milestones the computer can play the other hands.

Reception
Forrest Johnson reviewed Milestones in The Space Gamer No. 40. Johnson commented that "Milestones is not for the average wargamer - strategy can be optimized much too easily. Still, it is a good game for people who enjoy solitaire."

References

External links
Review in Softalk

1981 video games
Apple II games
Apple II-only games
Digital card games
Video games developed in the United States